Latin Rhythm Albums is a record chart published by Billboard magazine. Like all Billboard album charts, the chart is based on sales, which are compiled by Nielsen SoundScan based on sales data from merchants representing more than 90 percent of the U.S. music retail market. The sample includes sales at music stores, the music departments of electronics and department stores, direct-to-consumer transactions, and Internet sales of physical albums or digital downloads. A limited array of verifiable sales from concert venues is also tabulated. The chart is composed of studio, live, and compilation releases by Latin artists performing in the Latin hip hop, urban, dance and reggaeton, the most popular Latin Rhythm music genres. It joins the main Latin Albums chart along with its respective genre components: the Latin Pop Albums, Tropical Albums, and Regional Mexican Albums charts.

History
It appeared every other week in Billboard magazine, rotating with the Tropical Albums chart and was updated weekly on Billboard online websites. The chart launched with the issue dated 21 May 2005 and its respective airplay component, the Latin Rhythm Airplay chart was also later launched on 19 August 2005. Following the installation of the Latin Rhythm Airplay chart, it and the Latin Rhythm Albums chart now rotate bi-weekly with both the Tropical Albums and Tropical Songs charts in magazine, however are all updated weekly online. With the launch of the main Latin Rhythm Albums chart, reggaeton albums were no longer eligible for appearance on the Tropical Albums and Reggae Albums charts. Likewise, banda rap albums no longer appear on the Regional Mexican Albums chart. Latin hip hop and dance albums were also withheld from appearing on the Latin Pop Albums chart.

Daddy Yankee's Barrio Fino (2004) was the first album to reach number-one on the chart. According to Geoff Mayfield, the goal of the chart was not to be a reggaeton-only chart, despite the inaugural listing having all fifteen slots taken up by reggaeton titles. By moving reggaeton albums from the respective Tropical and Reggae Albums charts, it opened slots for re-entries and debuts, on those charts. American bachata group Aventura claimed the top spot on the Tropical Albums chart, which marked the first time since the issue dated 6 November 2004 that a reggaeton album was not at the number-one spot. Wisin & Yandel are the duo with the most number-one albums and entries on the chart. Daddy Yankee is the male artist with the most solo number-one albums and entries on the chart. Ivy Queen is the only female artist to have a number-one album on the Latin Rhythm Albums chart. She currently has two number-one and five top ten albums on that chart. Likewise, she is one of the few female artists to rank in the top ten of the Latin Rhythm Airplay chart along with Nina Sky, Shakira, RBD, Beyoncé Knowles, Cassie, and Keyshia Cole. Ana Tijoux's 2012 album La Bala reached number two on the chart. The record label Machete Music claims 80% of Latin Rhythm Album sales.

Chart achievements

Artist with the most number-one hits

Artist with the most entries on the Billboard chart

References

Billboard charts